Technical Vocational High School (known colloquially as Tec Voc), is a high school in the west end of Winnipeg, Manitoba.

Tec Voc's sports teams are named The Hornets.

History
Tec Voc was founded in 1951 by the Winnipeg School Division with the goal of creating the top technical high school in the province of Manitoba.  Tec Voc is located in the City of Winnipeg, in the West End.  

Students at Tec Voc can earn a Vocational Diploma and an Academic Diploma.

In terms of physical size, Tec Voc is the largest high school in Manitoba. It has a population of around 1200 students, placing it as the 8th most populated school in Winnipeg School Division.

Sports
Students at Tec Voc participate in multiple sports.  Some of the school sports teams include:
Football
Volleyball
Basketball
Soccer
Badminton
Track and Field
Cheerleading
Curling
Golf
Dance Tec Company (DTC)
 Rugby
 Wrestling

Skills Canada
Each year, Tec Voc sends teams to compete in Skills Manitoba, with the winners competing at Skills Canada. Tec Voc students have won at Skills Manitoba.

References

External links 

 Technical Vocational High School
 Winnipeg School Division

High schools in Winnipeg
Educational institutions established in 1951
1951 establishments in Manitoba

West End, Winnipeg
Schools in downtown Winnipeg